The Russian Sleep Experiment is a creepypasta which tells the tale of 5 test subjects being exposed to an experimental sleep-inhibiting stimulant in a Soviet-era scientific experiment, which has become the basis of an urban legend. Many news organizations, including Snopes, News.com.au, and LiveAbout, trace the story's origins to a website, now known as the Creepypasta Wiki, being posted on August 10, 2010, by a user named OrangeSoda, whose real name is unknown.

Story
The story recounts an experiment set in 1947 at a covert Soviet test facility. In a military-sanctioned scientific experiment, five prisoners that were deemed 'Enemies of the State' were kept in a sealed gas chamber, with an experimental gas-based stimulant compound continually administered to keep the subjects awake for 30 consecutive days. The prisoners were falsely promised that they would be set free from the prison if they completed the experiment in the specified 30 days. The subjects behaved as usual during the initial 5 days, talking to each other and whispering to the researchers through the one-way glass, though it was noted that their discussions gradually became darker in the subject matter. After 9 days, one subject began screaming uncontrollably for hours while the others did not react to his outburst. The man screamed for so long that he tore his vocal cords, and was rendered mute as a result. When the second one started screaming, the others prevented the researchers from looking inside by pasting torn book pages and their own feces  on the porthole windows. A few days passed without the researchers being able to look inside, during which the chamber was completely silent. The researchers used the intercom to test if the subjects were still alive, and got a short response of a subject expressing compliance.

On the 15th day, the researchers decided to turn off the stimulating gas and reopen the chamber. The subjects did not want the gas to turn off, for fear they would fall asleep. Upon looking inside, they discovered that the four surviving subjects had performed lethal and severe mutilation and disembowelment on themselves during the past days, including tearing off sections of skin and muscles, removing multiple abdominal internal organs, practicing self-cannibalism  on themselves, as well as cannibalism of the second subject, and allowing  of blood and water to accumulate on the floor by jamming paper and pieces of flesh they tore from the second subject into several drains, who was found dead on the floor as soon as the chamber was opened. The subjects violently refused to leave the chamber and begged the scientists to continue administering the stimulant, murdering one soldier and severely injuring another that attempted to remove them. After eventually being removed from the chamber, all subjects were shown to exhibit extreme strength, unprecedented resistance to anaesthetics and sedatives, the ability to remain alive despite lethal injuries, and a desperate desire to stay awake and be given the stimulant. It was also found that if any one of the subjects fell asleep, they would die.

After being somewhat treated for their severe injuries, the surviving three subjects were prepared to return to the gas chamber with the stimulant by the orders of the military officials (though against the will of the researchers), with EEG monitors showing short recurring moments of brain death. Before the chamber was sealed, one of the subjects fell asleep and died, and the only subject that could speak screamed to be immediately sealed in the chamber. The military commander ordered for three other researchers to be closed inside the chamber alongside the two remaining subjects. One researcher immediately drew his gun and killed the commander and the mute subject by shooting both of them in the head, causing the other person to flee the room. With only one surviving subject, the terrified researcher explained that he would not allow himself to be locked in a room with monsters that could no longer be called people. He desperately asked what the subject was, to which the subject smiled and identified himself and the other fallen subjects as an inherent evil inside the human mind that is kept in check by the act of sleeping. After a brief pause, the researcher shot the prisoner in the heart, and with his dying breath on the floor, the subject muttered his final words; "So...nearly...free..."

Popularity and reception
The Russian Sleep Experiment became immensely popular upon its original publication. It is considered by some to be the greatest and most shared creepypasta story ever made and Dread Central's Josh Millican has called it "one of the most shocking and impactful urban legends of the Internet Age". Much of the online and offline debate surrounds the belief held by many that the story is real rather than fiction, and many articles therefore seek to debunk this claim.

The creepypasta is often shared alongside an image of a grotesque, demonic figure, which is implied to be one of the test subjects. The image is actually of a life-size animatronic Halloween prop called "Spazm".

Literary criticism
In the chapter "Horror Memes and Digital Culture" in The Palgrave Handbook of Contemporary Gothic, Tosha R. Taylor wrote that the creepypasta "reflects residual political anxieties as it purports to reveal a top-secret effort by Russian scientists in World War II." Aleksandra Serwotka and Anna Stwora examined "Russian Sleep Experiment" and other creepypasta, stating that most creepypasta that focused on experiments feature scientists who "are frequently somehow related either to Nazi Germany or Soviet Russia".

Sonali Srivastav and Shikha Rai drew comparisons between "Russian Sleep Experiment" and the 2018 miniseries Ghoul, noting that the series took inspiration from the creepypasta.

Adaptations
The Russian Sleep Experiment's popularity has led to various adaptations over the years. A novel inspired by the original short story was published in 2015 but is now out-of-print.

The 2019 play Subject UH1317 - When Science Traces A Deadly Turn is based on the short story.

In early 2018, a psychological thriller based on the short story began production in Ireland, directed by John Farrelly. The film was subsequently released in November 2022.

In July 2019, horror author Jeremy Bates published The Sleep Experiment, a novel closely based on the original short story.

Several other adaptations have been created, including a film based on the short story entitled The Soviet Sleep Experiment, with Chris Kattan starring and Barry Andersson directing. Filming for the movie took place in Lakeville, Minnesota during 2018.

References

Further reading
 
 

Fiction set in the 1940s
Soviet Union in fiction
Fakelore
Horror short stories
Cannibalism in fiction
Human experimentation in fiction
Internet memes
Urban legends
Creepypasta